Rubén Garcés Sobrevia (born 7 November 1993) is a Spanish footballer who plays for SD Ejea as a central defender.

Club career
Born in Huesca, Aragon, Garcés joined SD Huesca's academy in 1999, aged 5. On 7 January 2012, while still a junior, he made his official debut with the first team, starting and playing the full 90 minutes in a 0–2 away loss against FC Cartagena in the Segunda División. He finished his youth career in 2012, being subsequently sent to farm team AD Almudévar.

In the summer of 2013, after achieving promotion to the Tercera División with his parent club's reserves, Garcés was definitely promoted to the main squad. On 5 July of the following year, he signed for Segunda División B side CD Toledo.

References

External links
Huesca official profile 

1993 births
Living people
People from Huesca
Sportspeople from the Province of Huesca
Spanish footballers
Footballers from Aragon
Association football defenders
Segunda División players
Segunda División B players
Tercera División players
SD Huesca footballers
AD Almudévar players
CD Toledo players
Arandina CF players
CF La Nucía players
SD Ejea players
CD Alcoyano footballers